Daryl Keith Holton (November 23, 1961 – September 12, 2007) was an American Gulf War veteran and convicted child murderer who was executed by electrocution by the state of Tennessee on September 12, 2007, in Riverbend Maximum Security Institution in Nashville.

Crime
Holton, a Gulf War veteran, was 36 years old when he fatally shot his three young sons and their half-sister: Stephen Edward Holton (12), Brent Holton (10), Eric Holton (6), and Kayla Marie Holton (4) with a Chinese-made semi-automatic rifle on November 30, 1997, at the garage where he worked in Shelbyville, Tennessee. Holton was divorced, and his ex-wife had custody of the children. About an hour later, Holton turned himself in to the Shelbyville police; he told investigators that he had killed the children because "families should stay together; a father should be with his children." He said he had also planned to kill his ex-wife and then himself, but had changed his mind.

Trial
At his June 1999 trial, Holton declined to testify on his own behalf, although his attorney sought to convince the jury that Holton was mentally incompetent at the time of the killings. Witnesses for the defense testified that Holton showed signs of carbon monoxide poisoning, although they could not definitively conclude that he had been exposed to carbon monoxide. Psychiatrists for the state and the defense also testified that Holton had major depressive disorder and passive-aggressive personality disorder at the time of the murders. The jury rejected the insanity defense; Holton was found guilty and sentenced to death.

During his imprisonment, Holton became an amateur legal expert, and he took steps to ignore the automatic and voluntary appeals process afforded to all condemned men and women under state and U.S. law. He also declined to cooperate with the federally or state-appointed capital defenders who sought to offer him legal assistance and counsel. For this reason, he is often included among the group described as death row "volunteers."

Execution
Holton chose to die in the electric chair, rather than by lethal injection, which is now the standard method of execution in Tennessee. Death-row inmates who committed their capital crime when the electric chair was still the official execution method are permitted to choose between the two methods. Holton was the first person to be executed by electrocution in Tennessee in 47 years. Moments before his execution, prison warden Ricky Bell asked Holton if he had any final words. He replied: "Two words: I do". He declined the traditional special last meal before his execution and instead, ate the regular prison meal which consisted of riblets on a bun, mixed vegetables, baked beans, white cake with white icing and iced tea.

Holton's was the fourth execution in Tennessee since 2000 and first by the electric chair since 1960 (the last pre-Furman execution). It was also the first use of Tennessee's electric chair after it was retrofitted by Fred A. Leuchter and moved to Riverbend from the former Tennessee State Prison. Holton was the third death row inmate executed under administration of Governor Phil Bredesen. He was also the first American put to death by electrocution since July 20, 2006. The last was Brandon Wayne Hedrick in Virginia, who also chose electrocution over injection. His body was cremated after his execution.

Controversy
His case raised some controversy because of rumors about his history of mental illness. While execution of the mentally disabled was prohibited by the U.S. Supreme Court case Atkins v. Virginia of 2002, the execution of the mentally ill has never been held to be in violation of the Eighth Amendment.

Holton, his motives, and the ethics of his execution are examined in the 2008 documentary film Robert Blecker Wants Me Dead.

See also 
 Capital punishment in Tennessee
 Capital punishment in the United States
 John David Battaglia
 Edmund Zagorski, the second post-Furman execution by electrocution in Tennessee
 List of people executed in Tennessee
 List of people executed in the United States in 2007
 List of white defendants executed for killing a black victim
 Race and capital punishment in the United States

References

1961 births
2007 deaths
21st-century executions by Tennessee
21st-century executions of American people
American mass murderers
American murderers of children
American people executed for murder
Executed mass murderers
Filicides in the United States
Mass murder in 1997
Mass murder in the United States
People convicted of murder by Tennessee
People executed by Tennessee by electric chair
People from Shelbyville, Tennessee
People with mood disorders
People with passive-aggressive personality disorder
Place of birth missing